Demidovo is a rural locality (a village) in Zheleznodorozhnoye Rural Settlement, Sheksninsky District, Vologda Oblast, Russia. The population was 131 as of 2002.

Geography 
Demidovo is located 18 km northwest of Sheksna (the district's administrative centre) by road. Sokolye is the nearest rural locality.

References 

Rural localities in Sheksninsky District